Rogelio Onofre (born 12 December 1939) is a Filipino sprinter. He competed in the men's 100 metres at the 1964 Summer Olympics.

Early life and education
Onofre was born on 12 December 1939 in the then town of Tarlac in the province of Tarlac but grew up in Dagupan, Pangasinan. According to his own account, Onofre often competed and won in local athletic races in his hometown of Dagupan barefooted prior to entering high school. He also competed in races in neighboring Binmaley as well in regional private schools athletics meets. In 1963, Onofre was given a Fulbright scholarship enabling him to pursue studies in Colorado and Los Angeles in the United States.

Career
Onofre initially competed in men's high jump in regional private school meets and was scouted by coaches of the Philippine athletics team becoming a candidate for the 1958 Asian Games in Tokyo. He shifted to 100 and 200-meter runs since he felt inadequate in high jump and he eventually secured a berth in the men's 4x100-meter relay squad with Remegio Vista, Isaac Gomez and Claro Pellosis; all gold medalists in the 1958 Games. Onofre competing in the 4x100-meter relay won a gold medal in the 1962 Asian Games in Jakarta. A year after the games, he secured a Fulbright scholarship which enabled him to train and study in the United States. Onofre along with Vista, William Mordeno, Arnulfo Valles took part in the 4x100-meter relay at the 1966 Asian Games in Bangkok where they settled for bronze. His last major competition was the 1968 Summer Olympics in Mexico City where he competed in men's 100-meter and 110-meter hurdles; failing to progress from the preliminaries.

Post-retirement
After retiring from athletics, Onofre settled in the United States living in San Francisco by 2021. He also has a granddaughter; Zion Corales Nelson who became an athlete like himself, who won a silver in the women's 4x100 meter relay in the 2019 Southeast Asian Games. In 2021, he was inducted to the Philippine Sports Hall of Fame.

References

External links
 

1939 births
Living people
Athletes (track and field) at the 1960 Summer Olympics
Athletes (track and field) at the 1964 Summer Olympics
Athletes (track and field) at the 1968 Summer Olympics
Filipino male sprinters
Olympic track and field athletes of the Philippines
Place of birth missing (living people)
Athletes (track and field) at the 1962 Asian Games
Athletes (track and field) at the 1966 Asian Games
Medalists at the 1962 Asian Games
Medalists at the 1966 Asian Games
Asian Games medalists in athletics (track and field)
Asian Games gold medalists for the Philippines
Asian Games bronze medalists for the Philippines
Sportspeople from Pangasinan
Sportspeople from Tarlac
Filipino expatriates in the United States
Philippine Sports Hall of Fame inductees